Ectoconus (Greek: "outside" (ektos), "cone" (konos)) is an extinct genus of terrestrial herbivorous mammal of the family Periptychidae, endemic to North America during the Early Paleocene subepochs (66—63.3 mya) existing for approximately .

Taxonomy

Ectoconus was stoutly built, sheep-sized condylarth and had a small braincase, short, strong limbs and a heavy tail. Its feet had five hooved digits much in the manner of extremely primitive ungulates. It was named by Cope (1884) and was synonymized subjectively with Conoryctes by Cope (1885). It was assigned to Periptychidae by Cope (1884), Cope (1888), Osborn and Earle (1895), Matthew (1937) and Carroll (1988); and to Periptychinae by Archibald (1998) and Eberle (2003).

Nearly complete skeletons of Ectoconus have been found in New Mexico and it is one of the most completely known Paleocene mammals.

References

Condylarths
Paleocene mammals of North America
Fossil taxa described in 1884
Prehistoric placental genera
Taxa named by Edward Drinker Cope